Peter J. Buckley (born May 10, 1957) is a Democratic politician from the U.S. State of Oregon. He represented District 5, consisting of Ashland, Phoenix, Talent, Jacksonville, Ruch and Applegate, in the Oregon House of Representatives. Buckley was first elected in 2004 and served until 2017. He served on the Education Committee (Chair), the Education Subcommittee On Education Innovation, the Education Subcommittee On Higher Education (Chair), the Elections, Ethics and Rules Committee (Vice-Chair), and the Transportation Committee.

Early life and career
Born in San Francisco, California, Buckley received a Bachelor of Fine Arts degree from the University of Santa Clara in 1979. Buckley worked for more than 20 years in non-profit management. He turned the financially struggling Ferndale Repertory Theater into a successful local art center, adding staff and health care benefits for the first time in the organization's history. He worked to improve cultural tourism and create jobs in Humboldt County as an extension of his work with the Dell’Arte International school of theater arts.

He also worked on the nationally recognized Arts Plus programs for K-8 classrooms through work with the National Endowment for the Arts in Washington, D.C., and with the Boys & Girls Club, Hospice of Humboldt, KEET-TV (PBS), KHSU (NPR), Humboldt Senior Center, Arcata Children's Center, Pacific Art Center, the Ink People, and Head Start to raise funds. For 15 years, Buckley has been a political commentator for NPR affiliates, including Jefferson Public Radio.

Political career
In 2002, as a Democrat, he ran unsuccessfully for U.S. Congress representing Oregon's 2nd congressional district against incumbent Republican Greg Walden. In 2004, he was elected to an open seat in the Oregon House of Representatives, and was re-elected in 2006 and 2008.

Personal life
A resident of Ashland, Buckley is married to Joan Langley and has three sons.

References

External links
 Oregon State House - Peter Buckley official government website
 2006 2004 campaign contributions
 Campaign website

1957 births
Living people
Democratic Party members of the Oregon House of Representatives
Santa Clara University alumni
Politicians from Ashland, Oregon
Politicians from San Francisco
21st-century American politicians